The Robins were a successful and influential American R&B group of the late 1940s and 1950s, one of the earliest such vocal groups who established the basic pattern for the doo-wop sound. They were founded by Ty Terrell, and twin brothers Billy Richards and Roy Richards. Bobby Nunn soon joined the lineup. They began their career as the Bluebirds but switched to recording as the Robins in May 1949. In 1955, the group disagreed over whether to remain on the West Coast or sign with Atlantic Records and move to the East Coast. This led to a split within the group. Music producers and songwriters Jerry Leiber and Mike Stoller took former Robins members Nunn and Carl Gardner, recruited singers Leon Hughes and Billy Guy, and formed the Coasters. The founding Richards brothers and Tyrell continued to record as the Robins until 1961.

Original members 
Bobby Nunn, lead and bassist
Terrell "Ty" Leonard, vocals
Billy Richard, vocals
Roy Richard, vocals

Singles

References

External links 
The Robins Story & Discography

 as The Ding Dongs

Doo-wop groups
African-American musical groups